= Haidarah Al Kawamleh =

Jordanian weightlifter

- Born: August 16, 1978 (age 47); Amman, The Hashemite Kingdom of Jordan
- Occupations: Player lifting weights global, Teacher for children disabilities
- Years active: 1999-present

Haidarah Al Kawamleh is a weightlifting Jordanian titlist at the worldwide fourth and fifth Paralympics in Brazil (2016). He was infected with polio as a youngster. He continued his studies at the Faculty of Education where he earned a degree in special education and works as a teacher for children disabilities for more than 15 years.

== Career ==
His love to sport began when he was a child. He joined the Jordan national team to lift weights for the disabled for less 18 years after the guideline level. He played for a short time and then was interrupted for four years. In 2003, he returned to practice sport without interruption to this day.

== Awards ==
- Tenth place at the Paralympics Summer Games in 2004 in Athens, Greece.
- A bronze medal at the Arab Games in 2007 in Egypt.
- A silver medal for weightlifting with disabilities at the Asian Championship in order to lift 195 kg in weight of 100 kg
- A silver medal in Fazza International Weightlifting Tournament held in 2010 in Dubai.
- A gold medal in 2010 at the International Weightlifting Tournament of Independence in the 100 kg weight.
- A silver medal at the Asian Championship in 2010 in Malaysia.
- The fourth place at the Asian Paralympics Games in 2010, which concluded in Guangzhou city in China when the cycle of lifting 192,5 kg out of 10 players.
- Seventh place at the Paralympics Summer Games 2012 in London after he had achieved the required number and qualification of 212,5 kg during his competition in the tournament of Malaysia and ranked tenth on the international list.
- A silver medal in the weight of 107 kg in Hungary International Championship
- Fifth place at the 2016 Summer Paralympics Games in Rio de Janeiro when he lifted 204 kg in weight of 107 kg.
